Friolzheim is a municipality of the Enz district in Baden-Württemberg, Germany. The Friolzheimer Riese telecommunications tower is located here.

History 
Friolzheim remained a possession of the monastery until it was dissolved in 1807 following German mediatization.

Geography 
Most of the municipal area lies in the Heckengäu, a region characterized by karstified and forested muschelkalk hills covered with thin layers of soil.

A portion of the Federally-protected  natural reserve is located in the southeast of the municipality.

Coat of arms 
Friolzheim's municipal coat of arms is divided vertically between an image of a stag in gold upon a field of blue on the right, and five bars – three gold and two blue – on the left. It was officially approved by the Federal Ministry of the Interior on 11 December 1957.

References 

Enzkreis
Württemberg